101st Regiment of Foot may refer to regiments of the British Army:

101st Regiment of Foot (Royal Bengal Fusiliers), raised in 1652
101st Regiment of Foot (1760), or Johnstone's Highlanders, raised in 1760
101st Regiment of Foot (1780), raised in 1780
101st Regiment of Foot (1794), raised in 1794
101st Regiment of Foot (Duke of York's Irish), raised in 1805